Neha Sharma (born 21 November 1987) is an Indian actress and model. Sharma made her acting debut with the Telugu film Chirutha (2007) and her Hindi film debut with Crook (2010). She was highly appreciated for the semi-hit Kyaa Super Kool Hai Hum.

Sharma has appeared in several films including Yamla Pagla Deewana 2 (2013), Solo (2017) and Tanhaji (2020). She made her web debut with the series Illegal in 2020 and has also been part of the short film Kriti, where she played the titular role.

Early life
A native of Bihar, Sharma attended the Mount Carmel School in Bhagalpur and pursued a course in fashion design from the National Institute of Fashion Technology (NIFT) in New Delhi. She confessed being severely asthmatic in childhood and always unwell and weak physically. She also claimed to be completely cured of asthma with the blessing of a family in Hyderabad.

Personal life
Her personal hobbies are cooking, listening to music, reading, and dance. Sharma is trained in the Indian classical dance form called Kathak. Apart from that, she has also learned street hip hop, Latin dancing-salsa, merengue, jive, and jazz from the Pineapple Dance Studios in London. She considers Kate Moss as her style inspiration. Sharma also aspires to launch her own clothing label.

Filmography

Films

Web series

Short Film

Music videos

Recognition
 Featured at No. 31 in The Times of India's 50 Most Desirable Women in 2010, at No. 26 in 2011, at No. 15 in 2012, at No. 13 in 2013, at No. 17 in 2014, at No. 32 in 2015, at No. 33 in 2016, at No. 36 in 2017, at No. 44 in 2018, at No. 44 in 2019, at No. 32 in 2020.
 Featured at No. 7 on FHM 100 sexiest women in the world in 2014.

See also
 List of people from Bihar
List of Indian film actresses
List of Hindi film actresses
List of Punjabi cinema actresses

References

External links

 
 
 
 

1987 births
Living people
21st-century Indian actresses
Actresses from Bihar
Actresses in Hindi cinema
Actresses in Malayalam cinema
Actresses in Tamil cinema
Actresses in Telugu cinema
Female models from Bihar
Indian film actresses
People from Bhagalpur